The W.J. and Nettie J. Cornell House, also known as the Samuel G. & Sophia J. Ruby House, and the A. W. & Martha A. Crawford House, is a historic residence located in Winterset, Iowa, United States.  Cornell was a banker who hired local contractor Fred Lewis to erect this Queen Anne house from 1893 to 1896.  He and his wife lived here for a couple of years when they sold the house to the Rubeys for $5,000 in 1898. Samuel Ruby was a railroad lawyer who served as Consul to Belfast during the Benjamin Harrison administration.  The wrap-around porch was added to the house during the Ruby's occupancy.  A. W. Crawford was a grocer who acquired his wealth through land speculation in Texas, while living in Winterset.  He was known for his local philanthropy.

The 2½-story frame house follows an asymmetrical design that is planned around a simple cross-gable system. It features a facade projection and a second-floor porch on the main facade.  The house was listed on the National Register of Historic Places in 1991.

References 

Houses completed in 1896
Queen Anne architecture in Iowa
Houses in Winterset, Iowa
National Register of Historic Places in Madison County, Iowa
Houses on the National Register of Historic Places in Iowa